Eleanor de Bohun ( – 3 October 1399) was the elder daughter and co-heiress (with her sister, Mary de Bohun), of  Humphrey de Bohun, 7th Earl of Hereford (1341–1373) and Joan Fitzalan, a daughter of Richard FitzAlan, 10th Earl of Arundel and his second wife Eleanor of Lancaster.

Marriage
In 1376, Eleanor married Thomas of Woodstock, 1st Duke of Gloucester. Thomas was the youngest son of Edward III of England and Philippa of Hainault. Following their marriage, the couple went to reside in Pleshey Castle, Essex. According to Jean Froissart, Eleanor and her husband had the tutelage of her younger sister, Mary, who was being instructed in religious doctrine in the hope that she would enter a convent, thus leaving her share of the considerable Bohun inheritance to Eleanor and Thomas.

Issue
Together Eleanor and Thomas had five children:

Humphrey, 2nd Earl of Buckingham (c. 1381/1382 – 2 September 1399)
Anne of Gloucester (c. 1383 – 1438) married (1st) Thomas Stafford, 3rd Earl of Stafford; (2nd) Edmund Stafford, 5th Earl of Stafford; and (3rd) William Bourchier, Count of Eu. Her son by 3rd marriage, John Bourchier, 1st Baron Berners, was grandfather of Richard Neville, 2nd Baron Latimer of Snape.
Joan (1384 – 16 August 1400) married Gilbert Talbot, 5th Baron Talbot (1383–1419). Died in childbirth.
Isabel (12 March 1385/1386 – April 1402), became a Minoress, later abbess, in a religious house near Aldgate 
Philippa (c. 1388) Died young

Order of the Garter
Eleanor de Bohun was made a Lady of the Garter in 1384. She became a nun sometime after 1397 at Barking Abbey. Prior to her death, Eleanor divided her holdings among her children.  She died on 3 October 1399 and was buried in Westminster Abbey. Her executors included the chaplain in Pleshy, Essex.

In fiction
Eleanor appears briefly in Anya Seton's historical romance Katherine, based upon the life of Eleanor's sister-in-law Katherine Swynford, the third wife of John of Gaunt. She also appears in Act 1, Scene 2 of Shakespeare's Richard II, where she unsuccessfully urges John of Gaunt to avenge her murdered husband.

Notes

References

Sources

External links
Eleanor of Bohun at Tudor Place

1360s births
1399 deaths
Date of birth unknown
Year of birth uncertain
Eleanor
Daughters of British earls
Essex
Gloucester
14th-century English people 
14th-century English women
Burials at Westminster Abbey
14th-century women rulers
Ladies of the Garter
Wives of knights